Dasypsyllus lasius is a species of flea in the family Ceratophyllidae. It was described by Rothschild in 1909.

References 

Ceratophyllidae
Insects described in 1909